Hanna Leena Kristiina Varis (b. 1959 in Kuusankoski) is a Finnish graphic artist and painter. She earned a Master of Arts degree from the Aalto University School of Arts, Design and Architecture in 1990. She participated in the NUROPE, Nomadic University for Art, Philosophy and Enterprise in Europe, in 2006–2010. She has held over 70 solo exhibitions and participated at over 140 group exhibitions. Her works are part of major art collections in Finland and abroad, such as the Kiasma, Amos Anderson Art Museum, and Helsinki Art Museum in Helsinki, Wäinö Aaltonen Museum of Art in Turku, and Albertina Museum in Vienna.

External links
 Hanna Varis' official website
 The YLE news article about Hanna Varis' solo exhibition at the Turku Castle, 31.7.2009
 Matti Lehtonen's review of Hanna Varis' solo exhibition in the Nefret gallery, Turku, 9.9.2008

1959 births
Living people
Finnish artists